Redwood Games is an American creator of educational video games, notably the Math Rescue and Word Rescue series, as well as Pickle Wars.

History
It was created about 1990 by Karen Crowther (now Karen Chun).  Named after the Redwood Trees of Mendocino California, the company is now located on Maui. Games developed at Redwood Games include Math Rescue, Word Rescue, Talking ABC's, Pickle Wars and Rescue the Scientists. Math and Word Rescue were distributed by Apogee Software as shareware. Rescue the Scientists was published by Compton's.

References

External links
 Redwood Games website
 Apogee Interview with Karen (Crowther) Chun

Video game companies of the United States